Morris Heights Health Center (MHHC) is a Federally Qualified Health Center that provides primary care, specialty services, dental and behavioral health services in the Bronx, New York City. MHHC operates across 30 sites including 19 school based sites healthcare services to thousands of patients all over the Bronx. Its mission is to be the vanguard for quality, affordable and accessible healthcare for all.

History 
In March, 1981, Founder Verona Greenland opened the first Morris Heights Health Center (MHHC) site, with the assistance of a $25,000 Neighborhood Improvement grant on 70 West Burnside Avenue. In its first year MHHC provided health care services to over 2,000 individuals and families.
MHHC is one of the first community health centers in the nation that initiated the comprehensive HIV program model on which the Ryan White HIV is predicated. MHHC also provided an out-of-hospital childbearing center solely run by midwives, which saw reductions in the community's infant mortality rate; while providing a homelike birthing experience for several thousand women. Lastly, MHHC is one of the first Federally Qualified Health Center (FQHC) in New York City to be accredited by the Joint Commission. 
The center recently constructed a $50 million, six-story facility at 57-69 West Burnside Avenue. Utilizing a combination of advocacy, low income tax credit and 202 funding from the United States Department of Housing and Urban Development, Morris Heights Health Center was able to build a 71-unit senior housing building. 
Morris Heights Health Center serves approximately 52,000 patients annually and is set to open an additional site early next year.

Sites

Burnside

In May, 1987, the Center  pened its 33,000-square-foot headquarters at 85 West Burnside. The location was previously  the site  the RKO Theater, next as the Burnside Manor catering hall, a school, and eventually serving as the center's main primary healthcare site.

Women's Health Pavilion
The first Morris Heights Health Center location opened its doors in March 1981 at 70 West Burnside Avenue, now known as the Women's Health Pavilion. It first began as a childbearing and birthing center that served over 3,500 patients a year, and now handles a broader range of women's health issues.

Harrison Circle

In 2010, the six story, 112,000-sq. foot facility opened its doors. The facility holds 71 unit housing center for seniors, and also houses Article 31 mental health services and several specialty services .

Walton

In 1997, MHHC opened a facility located at Walton Avenue and East 183rd Street. It offers primary care, behavioral health, dental care, case management, patient navigation and other supportive services at this location.

233rd
In April 2013,  the center  opened MHHC @ 233rd Street, a primary care health center at 825 E 233rd Street in the Borough of the Bronx. It had operated as  the   Pedro Espada Medical Center) before closing its doors in May 2012. The center provides primary care, behavioral health, and supportive services.

St. Ann's
While the building was built in 1931, the center opened its doors for business in January 2004 at St. Ann's  at 625 East 137th Street at 
this location. The MHHC clinic occupies 5,000 square feet and offers health care services including primary care, behavioral health, dental, family planning, patient navigation and other supportive services.

Melrose
In March 2014, MHHC opened its 7th clinical site located at 779 Melrose Avenue Bronx, NY 10451. The clinic is open to all residents of the Bronx but primarily serves community residents in the  High Bridge and Morrisania neighborhoods of  the South Bronx. It offers primary care, behavioral health and other supportive services in over 7,600 square feet of space.

School Based Health Centers
The center's  School Based Health Program operates 19 school based health centers ) in NYC Department of Education locations in the Bronx. Each  includes a primary care provider, a social worker and a medical assistant, as well as a health educator and dentist in some locations. Services include chronic disease management, preventive healthcare, complete physical examinations, mental health services, reproductive health and health education.

Leadership
Mari G. Millet serves as the President and Chief Executive Officer of Morris Heights Health Center.

References

External links
Stone, Susan E., and Barbara A. Anderson. Best Practices in Midwifery: Using the Evidence to Implement Change. N.p.: Springer, 2013. 93–94. Web. 
Mason, Diana J., Judith K. Leavitt, and Mary W. Chaffee. Policy & Politics in Nursing and Health Care. St. Louis, MO: Elsevier/Saunders, 2012. Print.

"Congressional Record, V. 151, Pt. 6, April 21, 2005 to May 5, 2005." Google Books. Congress, n.d. Web. 15 Aug. 2016.

Healthcare in New York City
Hospitals in the Bronx
Medical and health organizations based in New York City
Morris Heights, Bronx
University Heights, Bronx
Clinics in New York City